The 6th United States Congress was a meeting of the legislative branch of the United States federal government, consisting of the Senate and the House of Representatives. It met at Congress Hall in Philadelphia, Pennsylvania and in Washington, D.C. from March 4, 1799, to March 4, 1801, during the last two years of John Adams's presidency. It was the last Congress of the 18th century and the first to convene in the 19th. The apportionment of seats in House of Representatives was based on the 1790 United States census. Both chambers had a Federalist majority. This was the last Congress in which the Federalist Party controlled the presidency or either chamber of Congress.

Major events

 December 14, 1799: Former President George Washington died
 February 24, 1800: Library of Congress founded
 November 17, 1800: Congress held its first session in Washington, D.C.
 January 20, 1801: John Marshall was appointed Chief Justice of the United States
 February 17, 1801: 1800 United States presidential election: Thomas Jefferson became the first President of the United States elected by the House of Representatives as no candidate received a majority of the electoral votes cast in the 1800 presidential election. The House was required to choose between Jefferson and Aaron Burr, with each of the 16 states having a single vote. Jefferson was elected on the 36th ballot by 10 to 4 (with 2 abstentions).
{| class="wikitable"
!  | States for Jefferson
!  | States for Burr
! 

|-style="vertical-align:top;"
|
 Georgia
 Kentucky
 Maryland
 New Jersey
 New York
 North Carolina
 Pennsylvania
 Tennessee
 Vermont
 Virginia
|
 Connecticut
 Massachusetts
 New Hampshire
 Rhode Island
|
 Delaware
 South Carolina

|-
| |Total: 10 (63%)
| |Total: 4 (25%)
|bgcolor="#DFDFFF" | Total: 2 (12%)
|}

Major legislation

 February 13, 1801: Judiciary Act of 1801, Sess. 2, ch. 4, 
 February 27, 1801: District of Columbia Organic Act of 1801, Sess.2, ch. 15,

Territories organized
July 4, 1800: Indiana Territory created from a portion of the Northwest Territory.

Party summary
The count below identifies party affiliations at the beginning of the first session of this Congress, and includes members from vacancies and newly admitted states, when they were first seated. Changes resulting from subsequent replacements are shown below in the "Changes in membership" section.

Senate

House of Representatives

Leadership

Senate 
President: Thomas Jefferson (DR)
President pro tempore: Samuel Livermore (F), elected December 2, 1799
 Uriah Tracy (F),  elected May 14, 1800
 John E. Howard, (F), elected November 21, 1800
 James Hillhouse, (F), elected February 28, 1801

House of Representatives 
Speaker: Theodore Sedgwick (F)

Members
This list is arranged by chamber, then by state. Senators are listed by class, and representatives are listed by district.

Skip to House of Representatives, below

Senate
Senators were elected by the state legislatures every two years, with one-third beginning new six-year terms with each Congress. Preceding the names in the list below are Senate class numbers, which indicate the cycle of their election. In this Congress, Class 1 meant their term began in the last Congress, requiring re-election in 1802; Class 2 meant their term began in this Congress, requiring re-election in 1804; and Class 3 meant their term ended with this Congress, requiring re-election in 1800.

Connecticut 
 1. James Hillhouse (F)
 3. Uriah Tracy (F)

Delaware 
 1. Henry Latimer (F), until February 28, 1801
  Samuel White (F), from February 28, 1801
 2. William H. Wells (F)

Georgia 
 2. Abraham Baldwin (DR)
 3. James Gunn (F)

Kentucky 
 2. John Brown (DR)
 3. Humphrey Marshall (F)

Maryland 
 1. John Eager Howard (F)
 3. James Lloyd (F), until December 1, 1800
  William Hindman (F), from December 12, 1800

Massachusetts 
 1. Benjamin Goodhue (F), until November 8, 1800
  Jonathan Mason (F), from November 14, 1800
 2. Samuel Dexter (F), until May 30, 1800
  Dwight Foster (F), from June 6, 1800

New Hampshire 
 2. Samuel Livermore (F)
 3. John Langdon (DR)

New Jersey 
 1. James Schureman (F), until February 16, 1801
  Aaron Ogden (F), from February 28, 1801
 2. Jonathan Dayton (F)

New York 
 1. James Watson (F), until March 19, 1800
  Gouverneur Morris (F), from April 3, 1800
 3. John Laurance (F), until August 1800
  John Armstrong (DR), from November 6, 1800

North Carolina 
 2. Jesse Franklin (DR)
 3. Timothy Bloodworth (DR)

Pennsylvania 
 1. James Ross (F)
 3. William Bingham (F)

Rhode Island 
 1. Theodore Foster (F)
 2. Ray Greene (F)

South Carolina 
 2. Charles Pinckney (DR)
 3. Jacob Read (F)

Tennessee 
 1. Joseph Anderson (DR)
 2. William Cocke (DR)

Vermont 
 1. Nathaniel Chipman (F)
 3. Elijah Paine (F)

Virginia 
 1. Stevens Mason (DR)
 2. Wilson Nicholas (DR), from December 5, 1799

House of Representatives 
The names of members of the House of Representatives elected statewide on the general ticket or otherwise at-large, are preceded by an "At-large," and the names of those elected from districts, whether plural or single member, are preceded by their district numbers.

Connecticut 
All representatives were elected statewide on a general ticket.
 . Jonathan Brace (F), until May 1800
  John Cotton Smith (F), from November 17, 1800
 . Samuel W. Dana (F)
 . John Davenport (F)
 . William Edmond (F)
 . Chauncey Goodrich (F)
 . Elizur Goodrich (F)
 . Roger Griswold (F)

Delaware 
 . James A. Bayard (F)

Georgia 
Both representatives were elected statewide on a general ticket.
 . James Jones (F), until January 11, 1801, vacant thereafter
 . Benjamin Taliaferro (F)

Kentucky 
 . Thomas T. Davis (DR)
 . John Fowler (DR)

Maryland 
 . George Dent (F)
 . John C. Thomas (F)
 . William Craik (F)
 . George Baer Jr. (F)
 . Samuel Smith (DR)
 . Gabriel Christie (DR)
 . Joseph H. Nicholson (DR)
 . John Dennis (F)

Massachusetts 
 . Theodore Sedgwick (F)
 . William Shepard (F)
 . Samuel Lyman (F), until November 6, 1800
  Ebenezer Mattoon (F), from February 2, 1801
 . Dwight Foster (F), until June 6, 1800
  Levi Lincoln Sr. (DR), from December 15, 1800
 . Lemuel Williams (F)
 . John Reed Sr. (F)
 . Phanuel Bishop (DR)
 . Harrison Gray Otis (F)
 . Joseph Bradley Varnum (DR)
 . Samuel Sewall (F), until January 10, 1800
  Nathan Read (F), from November 25, 1800
 . Bailey Bartlett (F)
 . Silas Lee (F)
 . Peleg Wadsworth (F)
 . George Thatcher (F)

New Hampshire 
All representatives were elected statewide on a general ticket.
 . Abiel Foster (F)
 . Jonathan Freeman (F)
 . William Gordon (F), until June 12, 1800
  Samuel Tenney (F), from December 8, 1800
 . James Sheafe (F)

New Jersey 
 . John Condit (DR)
 . Aaron Kitchell (DR)
 . James Linn (DR)
 . James H. Imlay (F)
 . Franklin Davenport (F)

New York 
 . Jonathan N. Havens (DR), until October 25, 1799
  John Smith (DR), from February 27, 1800
 . Edward Livingston (DR)
 . Philip Van Cortlandt (DR)
 . Lucas C. Elmendorf (DR)
 . Theodorus Bailey (DR)
 . John Bird (F)
 . John Thompson (DR)
 . Henry Glen (F)
 . Jonas Platt (F)
 . William Cooper (F)

North Carolina 
 . Joseph Dickson (F)
 . Archibald Henderson (F)
 . Robert Williams (DR)
 . Richard Stanford (DR)
 . Nathaniel Macon (DR)
 . William H. Hill (F)
 . William Barry Grove (F)
 . David Stone (DR)
 . Willis Alston (F)
 . Richard Dobbs Spaight (DR)

Pennsylvania 
The 4th district was a plural district with two representatives.
 . Robert Waln (F)
 . Michael Leib (DR)
 . Richard Thomas (F)
 . Robert Brown (DR)
 . John Peter G. Muhlenberg (DR)
 . Joseph Hiester (DR)
 . John A. Hanna (DR)
 . John Wilkes Kittera (F)
 . Thomas Hartley (F), until December 21, 1800
  John Stewart (DR), from January 15, 1801
 . Andrew Gregg (DR)
 . Henry Woods (F)
 . John Smilie (DR)
 . Albert Gallatin (DR)

Rhode Island 
Both representatives were elected statewide on a general ticket.
 . John Brown (F)
 . Christopher G. Champlin (F)

South Carolina 
 . Thomas Pinckney (F)
 . John Rutledge Jr. (F)
 . Benjamin Huger (F)
 . Thomas Sumter (DR)
 . Robert Goodloe Harper (F)
 . Abraham Nott (F)

Tennessee 
 . William C. C. Claiborne (DR)

Vermont 
 . Matthew Lyon (DR)
 . Lewis R. Morris (F)

Virginia 
 . Robert Page (F)
 . David Holmes (DR)
 . George Jackson (DR)
 . Abram Trigg (DR)
 . John J. Trigg (DR)
 . Matthew Clay (DR)
 . John Randolph (DR)
 . Samuel Goode (DR)
 . Joseph Eggleston (DR)
 . Edwin Gray (DR)
 . Josiah Parker (F)
 . Thomas Evans (F)
 . John Marshall (F), until June 7, 1800
  Littleton W. Tazewell (DR), from November 26, 1800
 . Samuel J. Cabell (DR)
 . John Dawson (DR)
 . Anthony New (DR)
 . Leven Powell (F)
 . John Nicholas (DR)
 . Henry Lee (F)

Non-voting members
 . William Henry Harrison, until May 14, 1800
 William McMillan, from November 24, 1800

Changes in membership 
The count below reflects changes from the beginning of the first session of this Congress

Senate 
There were 7 resignations and 1 vacancy at the beginning of Congress. The Federalists had a 1-seat net loss and the Democratic-Republicans had a 2-seat net gain.

|-
| Virginia(2)
| Vacant
| Henry Tazewell (DR) died before the beginning of this Congress 
|  | Wilson C. Nicholas (DR)
| Elected December 5, 1799

|-
| New York(1)
|  | James Watson (F)
| Resigned March 19, 1800
|  | Gouverneur Morris (F)
| Elected April 3, 1800

|-
| Massachusetts(2)
|  | Samuel Dexter (F)
| Resigned May 30, 1800
|  | Dwight Foster (F)
| Elected June 6, 1800

|-
| New York(3)
|  | John Laurance (F)
| Resigned sometime in August, 1800
|  | John Armstrong (DR)
| Elected November 6, 1800

|-
| Massachusetts(1)
|  | Benjamin Goodhue (F)
| Resigned November 8, 1800
|  | Jonathan Mason (F)
| Elected November 14, 1800

|-
| Maryland(3)
|  | James Lloyd (F)
| Resigned December 1, 1800
|  | William Hindman (F)
| Elected December 12, 1800

|-
| New Jersey(1)
|  | James Schureman (F)
| Resigned February 16, 1801
|  | Aaron Ogden (F)
| Elected February 28, 1801

|-
| Delaware(1)
|  | Henry Latimer (F)
| Resigned February 28, 1801
|  | Samuel White (F)
| Appointed February 28, 1801
|}

House of Representatives 

There were 6 resignations and 3 deaths. The Federalists had a 4-seat net loss and the Democratic-Republicans had a 3-seat net gain.

|-
| 
|  | Jonathan Havens (DR)
| Died October 25, 1799
|  | John Smith (DR)
| February 27, 1800

|-
| 
| William Henry Harrison
| Resigned May 14, 1800, to become Territorial Governor of Indiana
| William McMillan
| November 24, 1800

|-
| 
|  | Jonathan Brace (F)
| Resigned sometime in 1800
|  | John Cotton Smith (F)
| November 17, 1800

|-
| 
|  | Samuel Sewall (F)
| Resigned January 10, 1800, to become a justice of the Massachusetts Supreme Judicial Court
|  | Nathan Read (F)
| November 25, 1800

|-
| 
|  | Dwight Foster (F)
| Resigned June 6, 1800, having been elected U.S. Senator
|  | Levi Lincoln (DR)
| December 15, 1800

|-
| 
|  | John Marshall (F)
| Resigned June 7, 1800, to become Secretary of State
|  | Littleton W. Tazewell (DR)
| November 26, 1800

|-
| 
|  | William Gordon (F)
| Resigned June 12, 1800, to become New Hampshire Attorney General
|  | Samuel Tenney (F)
| December 8, 1800

|-
| 
|  | Samuel Lyman (F)
| Resigned November 6, 1800
|  | Ebenezer Mattoon (F)
| February 2, 1801

|-
| 
|  | Thomas Hartley (F)
| Died December 21, 1800
|  | John Stewart (DR)
| February 3, 1801

|-
| 
|  | James Jones (F)
| Died January 11, 1801
| colspan=2 | Vacant until next Congress
|}

Committees
Lists of committees and their party leaders.

Senate

 Whole

House of Representatives

 Claims (Chairman: Dwight Foster then Nathaniel Macon)
 Commerce and Manufactures (Chairman: Samuel Smith)
 Elections (Chairman: Samuel W. Dana then George Dent) 
 Revisal and Unfinished Business (Chairman: Roger Griswold then Jonas Platt)
 Rules (Select) 
 Standards of Official Conduct 
 Ways and Means (Chairman: Robert Goodloe Harper then Roger Griswold)
 Whole

Joint committees

 Enrolled Bills (Chairman: Dwight Foster)

Administrative officers 
 Architect of the Capitol: William Thornton

Senate 
 Chaplain: William White, Episcopalian, until November 27, 1800
 Thomas J. Claggett, Episcopalian, elected November 27, 1800
 Doorkeeper: James Mathers
 Secretary: Samuel Otis

House of Representatives 
 Chaplain: Ashbel Green, Presbyterian, until November 27, 1800
 Thomas Lyell, Methodist, elected November 27, 1800
 Clerk: Jonathan W. Condy, resigned December 4, 1800
 John H. Oswald, elected December 9, 1800
 Doorkeeper: Thomas Claxton
 Reading Clerks: 
 Sergeant at Arms: Joseph Wheaton

See also 
 1798 United States elections (elections leading to this Congress)
 1798–99 United States Senate elections
 1798–99 United States House of Representatives elections
 1800 United States elections (elections during this Congress, leading to the next Congress)
 1800 United States presidential election
 1800–01 United States Senate elections
 1800–01 United States House of Representatives elections

References

Notes

External links
Statutes at Large, 1789-1875 
Senate Journal, First Forty-three Sessions of Congress
House Journal, First Forty-three Sessions of Congress
Biographical Directory of the U.S. Congress 
U.S. House of Representatives: House History 
U.S. Senate: Statistics and Lists